The Padma Vibhushan is the second highest civilian award of the Republic of India. Instituted on 2 January 1954, the award is given for the "exceptional and distinguished service", without distinction of race, occupation, position, or sex. The Padma Vibhushan award recipients are announced every year on Republic Day and registered in The Gazette of Indiaa publication released weekly by the Department of Publication, Ministry of Urban Development used for official government notices. The conferral of the award is not considered official without its publication in the Gazette. Recipients whose awards have been revoked or restored, both of which require the authority of the President, are also registered in the Gazette and are required to surrender their medals when their names are struck from the register. , none of the conferments of Padma Vibhushan have been revoked or restored. The recommendations are received from all the state and the union territory governments, the Ministries of the Government, the Bharat Ratna and previous Padma Vibhushan award recipients, the Institutes of Excellence, the Ministers, the Chief Ministers and the Governors of State, and the Members of Parliament including private individuals. The recommendations received during 1 May and 15 September of every year are submitted to the Padma Awards Committee, constituted by the Prime Minister. The committee recommendations are later submitted to the Prime Minister and the President for the further approval.

When instituted in 1954, the Padma Vibhushan was classified as "Pahela Varg" (Class I) under the three-tier Padma Vibhushan awards; preceded by the Bharat Ratna, the highest civilian award, and followed by "Dusra Varg" (Class II), and "Tisra Varg" (Class III). On 15 January 1955, the Padma Vibhushan was reclassified into three different awards; the Padma Vibhushan, the highest of the three, followed by the Padma Bhushan and the Padma Shri. The criteria includes "exceptional and distinguished service in any field including service rendered by Government servants" but excluding those working with the Public sector undertakings with the exception of doctors and scientists. The 1954 statutes did not allow posthumous awards but this was subsequently modified in the January 1955 statute. The award, along with other personal civil honours, was briefly suspended twice in its history; for the first time in July 1977 when Morarji Desai was sworn in as the fourth Prime Minister. The suspension was rescinded on 25 January 1980, after Indira Gandhi became the Prime Minister. The civilian awards were suspended again in mid-1992, when two Public-Interest Litigations were filed in the High Courts questioning the civilian awards being "Titles" per an interpretation of Article 18 (1) of the Constitution. The awards were reintroduced by the Supreme Court in December 1995, following the conclusion of the litigation.

The recipients receive a Sanad (certificate) signed by the President and a medal with no monetary grant associated with the award. The centrally placed pattern made of outer lines of a square of  side is embossed with a knob embossed within each of the outer angles of the pattern. A raised circular space of diameter  is placed at the centre of the decoration. A centrally located lotus flower is embossed on the obverse side of the medal and the text "Padma" written in Devanagari script is placed above and the text "Vibhushan" is placed below the lotus. The Emblem of India is placed in the centre of the reverse side with the national motto, "Satyameva Jayate" (Truth alone triumphs) in Devanagari Script, inscribed on the lower edge. The rim, the edges and all embossing on either side is of white gold with the text "Padma Vibhushan" of silver gilt. The medal is suspended by a pink riband  in width. It is ranked fourth in the order of precedence of wearing of medals and decorations.

The first recipients of the Padma Vibhushan were Satyendra Nath Bose, Nandalal Bose, Zakir Husain, Balasaheb Gangadhar Kher, V. K. Krishna Menon, and Jigme Dorji Wangchuck, who were honoured in 1954. , the award has been bestowed on 331 individuals, including twenty-eight posthumous and twenty-four non-citizen recipients. Some of the recipients have refused or returned their awards; P. N. Haksar, Vilayat Khan, E. M. S. Namboodiripad, Swami Ranganathananda, and Manikonda Chalapathi Rau refused the award; the family members of Lakshmi Chand Jain (2011) and Sharad Anantrao Joshi (2016) declined their posthumous conferments, and 1986 recipient Baba Amte and 2015 recipient Parkash Singh Badal returned theirs honour in 1991 and 2020 respectively. Most recently on 26 January 2023, the award has been bestowed upon six recipients; Balakrishna Doshi, Zakir Hussain, S. M. Krishna, Dilip Mahalanabis, S. R. Srinivasa Varadhan, and Mulayam Singh Yadav.

Recipients

Explanatory notes

Non-citizen recipients

Posthumous recipients

References

Bibliography

External links

 
 

Lists of Indian award winners